Halocharis is a genus of flowering plants belonging to the family Amaranthaceae.

Its native range is Iraq to Central Asia and Pakistan, Arabian Peninsula.

Species:

Halocharis brachyura 
Halocharis clavata 
Halocharis hispida 
Halocharis lachnantha 
Halocharis sulphurea 
Halocharis violacea

References

Amaranthaceae
Amaranthaceae genera